is an enzyme that in humans is encoded by the ST3GAL4 gene.

References

Further reading